Diwakar Nath Acharya (born 6 November 1969) is a Nepali scholar specialising in the religious and philosophical traditions of South Asia. Since April 2016, he has been the Spalding Professor of Eastern Religion and Ethics at the University of Oxford and a Fellow of All Souls College, Oxford. He previously taught at the Nepal Sanskrit University (1993–2003), the University of Hamburg (2003–2006), and Kyoto University (2011–2016).

Selected works

References

1969 births
Living people
Nepalese academics
20th-century Nepalese writers
21st-century Nepalese writers
Fellows of All Souls College, Oxford
Spalding Professors of Eastern Religion and Ethics
Indologists
Academic staff of the University of Hamburg
Academic staff of Kyoto University